Randy Baker (born May 14, 1958) is an American stock car racing driver. Son of Winston Cup champion Buck Baker, he competed in NASCAR's top divisions in the 1980s and 1990s, and currently operates a driving school.

Career 
Baker made his racing debut in 1976 at Thunder Valley Speedway in Leesville, South Carolina; he finished 10th in his first Limited Sportsman race. He made his debut in NASCAR's top series, then known as the Winston Cup Series, in 1982 at North Carolina Motor Speedway, finishing 20th in a family-owned Pontiac. Baker would run in a total of 14 Winston Cup races in his career, with a best finish of 17th at the 1987 Coca-Cola 600 Charlotte Motor Speedway. Baker also competed in five races in the NASCAR Busch Series, now the Xfinity Series, in 1989 and 1990, posting a best finish of 22nd at North Carolina Motor Speedway. Baker's final NASCAR start was at Atlanta Motor Speedway in the Winston Cup Series in November 1996; driving for Miles Motorsports, he completed 51 laps before crashing out of the race, finishing 41st.

Baker also competed in Automobile Racing Club of America competition; in 1986 he was injured in a crash at Daytona International Speedway in the Speedweeks ARCA 200.

Baker's last start in racing competition came in an ARCA event in 2008 at Kentucky Speedway; in 2009 he fielded a race team in ARCA for John Ferrier.

Personal life 
Baker is the son of two-time NASCAR Winston Cup Series champion Buck Baker and the brother of 1980 Daytona 500 winner Buddy Baker. He operates SpeedTech Racing Schools.

Motorsports career results

NASCAR
(key) (Bold - Pole position awarded by qualifying time. Italics - Pole position earned by points standings or practice time. * – Most laps led.)

Winston Cup Series

Daytona 500

Busch Series

References

External links
 
 Transcript of 2005 CNN interview with Baker
 Baker's 1996 crash at Atlanta

Living people
1958 births
Racing drivers from Charlotte, North Carolina
NASCAR drivers
ARCA Menards Series drivers